The Bird That Drinks Blood (Korean: 피를 마시는 새 Pireul masineun sae, abbreviated as 피마새 Pimasae) is a series of Korean fantasy novels by Lee Yeongdo. Set in the same world of Lee's previous work The Bird That Drinks Tears, the stories depict clashes between absolute power and free will with the backdrop of the Neo Arajit Empire (Korean: 신 아라짓 제국) that's ruled over by flying capital Skywhere (Korean: 하늘누리). The Empress Governheaven of the Empire secures the eternal empire against the Lekons and rebellious forces, but it is gradually revealed that behind the endless conflicts and confusion the Empress's ambitions and plots have played a major part as well. The story begins with four people; Jimen the Emperor Hunter and a one-eyed human girl Asil, whose dream of an independent nation of Lekons have been ruthlessly suppressed by the Empress, on whom they swore to wreak vengeance; the General-in-Chief Elsi who took the marches of a margrave who formed a faction to defy the Empress, and Jeong U, the margrave's daughter.

Korean press has compared Lee's the Bird series to J.R.R. Tolkien's Middle-earth works, in the aspect that Lee constructed languages and created geography, vegetation, and history that pans several thousand years. "Moreover, unlike Tolkien who set the virtual history simply as a mythical battleground of good and evil, in Lee's world the moving history, politics, industries and cultural background are constructed in such great detail that this another world feels real and urgent, and sucks you in." The Korean overtones of the world was also acclaimed. The ancient language of Arajit is based on the Proto-Korean language. The undefeated general Elsi enjoys a game of baduk while other characters enjoy traditional Korean folk games such as Ssireum and Yut Nori, and Jeong U dresses in what is similar to Hanbok and wears a binyeo in her hair. The Empire's system of rank and office is modeled after that of Silla and Goryeo.

Serialization and publication

Serialization 
As Lee's all multi-volume series, such as Dragon Raja(1998) and The Bird That Drinks Tears,(2002) The Bird That Drinks Blood was serialized on a serial forum of an online service provider, Hitel, "from the Christmas of 2003 to Christmas of 2004, exactly a year." It is the last of Lee's works to be on the forum before Hitel's closure in 2007. It is also his longest work to date. (August 2011)

Publication 
Golden Bough, an imprint of Minumsa Publishing Group, has been Lee's publisher since 1998, and also runs an online community site for the fans of Lee's works. After The Bird That Drinks Blood was completed, in January 2005 the publisher called for volunteer "reader editors" at the website, to come meet the author at the publisher's office where they could talk about their requests and ideas about how the book should be printed. The Bird That Drinks Blood was published in July 2005 in 8 hardcover volumes. Each volume's title is as follows:

Volume 1: The Emperor Hunter
Volume 2: The General-in-Chief of the Empire
Volume 3: The Ruler of the Bloodshed
Volume 4: The One That Wields Fire
Volume 5: The Master of Balkene
Volume 6: The Lekon That Walks in the Rain
Volume 7: The One That Burns Self
Volume 8: The One That Treads on The Sky

Races 
The fictional world of The Bird That Drinks Tears is inhabited by four chosen people, four races with their own deity  - humans, nagas, lekons and dokkebis.

Rumors and hopes for a Trilogy, or a Tetralogy 
After The Bird That Drinks Tears and The Bird That Drinks Blood, some readers wonder and hope that Lee would write the Bird series as a full tetralogy, because of an old tale told by the legendary Kitalger Hunters in The Bird That Drinks Tears:

There are four brother birds.Their appetites are all different.They are the bird that drinks water, the bird that drinks blood, the bird that drinks poison, and the bird that drinks tears.The one that lives the longest of them is the bird that drinks blood.Then, which one would live the shortest?It is the bird that drinks tears, because he drinks tears of others.The bird that drinks blood lives the longest, because he drinks what is so precious that no one wants to shed it out of their body.The body sheds tears on its own. How harmful it must be, for the body to shed it so?One that drinks such harmful thing would not live long.But it is said; the bird that drinks tears would sing the most beautiful songs.The bird that drinks blood lives the longest, because he drinks what is so precious that nobody wants to give out.But because he stinks of blood no one goes near.

One part of the tale about the other two birds are told in The Bird That Drinks Blood:

Poison is the gentlest and water is the sharpest. If you give poison, one falls asleep; but if you pour water, one springs up.The bird that flies the fastest is the bird that drinks poison, and the bird that flies the slowest is the bird that drinks water.

Lee's fans voice their hopes online that Lee would at least write The Bird That Drinks Poison, if The Bird That Drinks Water isn't dramatic enough for a fantasy title. When asked about this in interviews, Lee denies any plans for another sequel on his part, saying "I don't know anything for now. I have no plans."
In a 2008 interview, when asked "we understand that writing the "Bird" series has not been finished. Please let us know your future writing plans," Lee answered laughing: "there are lots of rumors[...] About this 'Bird' series too. I never declared that I would write a series, but before I knew it, the new quartet or new saga has become the ambition of this typer's life. Well. If a story that I want to type comes up I will type it, if not I won't type it. I don't have any ambitious plan going 'I will type before I die!'"

References

External links
 Lee Yeongdo Official Publication Cafe (Korean)
 The fan-made wiki database of The Bird That Drinks Tears and The Bird That Drinks Blood (Korean)

Fantasy novel series
Works by Lee Yeongdo
Novels first published in serial form
South Korean fantasy novels